Georgia State Route 520 Business may refer to:
Georgia State Route 520 Business (Albany), a current business loop in Albany, entirely concurrent with U.S. Route 82 Business
Georgia State Route 520 Business (Cusseta), a former business loop in Cusseta

520 Business